Lyttle is a surname predominantly found in Northern Ireland and Northern America. Notable people with the surname include:

Bradford Lyttle, prominent pacifist and peace activist, organizer with the Committee for Non-Violent Action
Chris Lyttle (born 1981), politician in Northern Ireland
David Lyttle (born 1984), musician, producer, songwriter, composer and record label owner from Northern Ireland
Des Lyttle (born 1971), English former footballer turned football manager
Foggy Lyttle, (born 1944), guitarist, best known for his work with Van Morrison
Hulda Margaret Lyttle (1889–1983), American nurse educator and hospital administrator 
Jim Lyttle (born 1946), former major league baseball player from Hamilton, Ohio
Joan Sylvia Lyttle Birman (born 1927), American mathematician, specializing in braid theory and knot theory
Kevin Lyttle (born 1976), soca artist from Saint Vincent and the Grenadines
Paul Lyttle (age 38), Canadian-American curler 
Sancho Lyttle (born 1983), professional basketball player born in Saint Vincent and the Grenadines
Tanya Katherine Rosales Lyttle (born 1981), Filipina telenovela and film actress
Tommy Lyttle (1939–1995), high-ranking Northern Irish loyalist during the Troubles
Wesley Guard Lyttle (1844–1896), Irish newspaper publisher, writer and editor
William Lyttle (1931–2010), hobby tunneller dubbed "The Mole Man of Hackney"

See also
Lyttle Lytton Contest, diminutive derivative of the Bulwer-Lytton Fiction Contest, and was first run in the year 2001
Little (disambiguation)
Lytle (disambiguation)

References